The Stranger is a fictional character appearing in American comic books published by Marvel Comics.

Publication history
The Stranger first appeared in X-Men #11 (May 1965) and was created by Stan Lee and Jack Kirby.

Fictional character biography
The character is a cosmic entity and principally a scientist and surveyor of worlds, first visiting Earth out of curiosity. After an encounter with the X-Men and Brotherhood of Evil Mutants, who first think he is a powerful mutant, the entity departs, taking the supervillain Magneto and his servant Toad off-world for further study after encasing them in special cocoons. The same title depicts Magneto's escape and return to Earth using a spaceship he repairs when the Stranger leaves the planet (leaving Toad behind). However, the Stranger recaptures the villain after Professor X telepathically alerts the Stranger.

The Stranger reappears in the title Tales to Astonish, becoming convinced that mankind is dangerous and sets out to destroy the Earth using the Hulk, allowing a better race of humanity to take over. He transports to Earth a machine that increases his mental power over the Hulk. The character is dissuaded from this course of action by the Hulk's alter-ego, Bruce Banner. However he takes the supervillain Abomination into space with him, thinking him truly evil. In the title the Silver Surfer, the Stranger again attempts to destroy the Earth, on this occasion using a powerful "Null-Life" bomb. After a battle with the Silver Surfer and learning that a human scientist sacrificed himself to defuse the bomb, the Stranger retreats.

In the title Fantastic Four the Stranger aids the superhero team against the entity the Overmind, and in Thor watches as the Thunder God battles the character's servant of the time, the Abomination. The title The Avengers features a story in which the Toad impersonates the Stranger and battles the superhero team. The true Stranger encounters the Kree warrior Captain Marvel in the title of the same name, and in Marvel Team-Up encounters the hero Spider-Man when trying to obtain the Soul Gem from Adam Warlock.

The Stranger also appears in the self-titled The Champions and aids the group to contain the reactivated Null-Life bomb left on Earth and in a Marvel Two-In-One Annual enlists the aid of the Thing and the Hulk to fight against the threat of the Olympian god Pluto.

The character reappears in the third volume of the Silver Surfer, where the entity known as the Living Tribunal reveals the fourth side of its head to be a void and claims that it could have represented the face of the Stranger.

The Stranger also joins the Avengers in battle against the space pirate Nebula, who has acquired the "Infinity Union", a device that allows the user to absorb all forms of ambient energy, and who seeks to acquire more by repeatedly destroying and recreating the universe.

In the title Quasar, cosmic beings known as the Watchers approach the Stranger for aid in halting a lethal information virus, with the hero Quasar taking advantage of the distraction to free many of the specimens on the Stranger's "Labworld".

In the limited series "Infinity Gauntlet", the Stranger appears among the gathering of cosmic entities opposing the Titan Thanos, and attacks the latter teamed with Epoch and Galactus.

In the limited series Starblast the Stranger is instrumental in merging the New Universe into the Marvel Universe. He next appears in a retold flashback story in Professor Xavier and the X-Men; and outside of continuity in Marvel Adventures.

In the limited series X-Men Forever, the character is revealed to have subtly manipulated and accelerated the evolution of human mutants for a long time, in a plot to harness their potential to gain control of all higher cosmic entities.

He next appears in Marvel Universe: The End, again among the beings opposing Thanos.

The Stranger prominently features in the limited series Beyond!, posing as the Beyonder wherein he captures several heroes and villains and forces them into battle for the purpose of study.

Powers and abilities
The Stranger possesses the ability to channel and manipulate cosmic power on a scale comparable to that of Galactus and the Celestials, with feats including levitation; force field creation; size shifting and molecular manipulation of matter; light speed space travel; intangibility and energy projection and assembling a planet from segments of inhabited worlds from across the universe. The entity also possesses a "laboratory" world, where items are stored, and beings of interest, referred to as specimens, are kept prisoner for study.

In other media
The Stranger appears in The Super Hero Squad Show episode "The Ballad of Beta Ray Bill! (Six Against Infinity, Part 1)", voiced by John Barrowman. This version enslaved the Korbinites, though Beta Ray Bill escaped and became a janitor. The Stranger eventually locates Bill, but is eventually defeated by him and Thor.

References

External links
 Stranger at Marvel.com

Characters created by Jack Kirby
Characters created by Stan Lee
Comics characters introduced in 1965
Marvel Comics scientists